Herman, or Harmen Hals (1611, Haarlem – 1669, Haarlem), was a Dutch Golden Age painter.

Biography

According to Houbraken he was the son of the painter Frans Hals and was like his brothers Jan and Frans II, good at music and painting.  He was a member of the Haarlem Guild of St. Luke.

According to the Netherlands Institute for Art History he was the oldest son of Frans Hals, and spent most of his life in Haarlem, but is registered in Vianen from 1642–45, and in Amsterdam in 1645. Works previously attributed to Adriaen Brouwer, another pupil of his father's, have since been attributed to him.

References

External links
Harmen Hals on Artnet

1611 births
1669 deaths
Dutch Golden Age painters
Dutch male painters
Artists from Haarlem
Painters from Haarlem
Harmen
Sibling artists